William Bouverie may refer to:

 William Bouverie, 1st Earl of Radnor (1725–1776), British peer
 William Henry Bouverie (1752–1806), British politician
 William Bouverie (priest) (1797–1877), Archdeacon of Norfolk

See also
 William des Bouverie (1656–1717), merchant in London